Switch is a 2013 Chinese-Hong Kong action film written and directed by Jay Sun and starring Andy Lau, Tong Dawei, Zhang Jingchu and Lin Chi-ling.

Synopsis
A famous Chinese Yuan Dynasty painting known as "Dwelling in the Fuchun Mountains" was stolen and being sold on the black market, led by a mysterious business magnate (Tong Dawei). Special agent Jinhan (Andy Lau) is tasked to recover the painting.

Meanwhile, Jinhan and his wife (Zhang Jingchu) have drifted apart, due to the secret nature of his work, unaware that his wife also works as a special agent tasked with protecting the painting.

Cast
 Andy Lau as Special Agent Xiao Jinhan
 Tong Dawei as Yamamoto Toshio
 Zhang Jingchu as Lin Yuyan
 Lin Chi-ling as Lisa
 Siqin Gaowa as The Empress
 Ariel Aisin-Gioro as The Princess
 Guan Xiaotong as Xiao Yueyue
 Siqin Gaowa as Old Dowager Empress 
 Tan Songyun as Pisces Demon

Release
Switch was originally set to be released in 2012, but was delayed partially due to the decision to convert the film to 3-D. The film was released in China on 9 June 2013 and in Hong Kong on 12 June, where its running time was trimmed by 9 minutes with several scenes cut out.

In China, the film grossed RMB 49 million (US$8 million) in its opening day.

References

External links

Chinese 3D films
Films set in 2011
2013 films
2013 3D films
2013 action films
Hong Kong 3D films
Hong Kong action films
Chinese action films
Media Asia films
Funimation
Films set in Hong Kong
Films set in Hangzhou
Films set in Dubai
Films shot in Dubai
2013 directorial debut films
2010s Mandarin-language films
2010s Hong Kong films